Meck may refer to:
 Model Engineering College-Kochi, a premier engineering institute in India
 Meck (musician)
 Meck Island
 von Meck, a surname (and list of people with that name)
 Meck, a character in Berlin Alexanderplatz

See also
 Mecklenburg (disambiguation)
 Mech (disambiguation)
 Mec (disambiguation)
 Mek (disambiguation)